In Belizean and Honduran folklore, the Sisimito (alternatively called Sisimite, Sisimita, Súkara, and Itacayo) is a bipedal upright gorilla-like creature that possesses a head much like a human, with long hair or fur covering its body. It is also referred to as "the Mexican Bigfoot", though it is also known in the neighboring countries of Guatemala and Nicaragua.

Description 
The Sisimite is believed to resemble a humanoid creature with black or dark brown fur, described as larger than an average person. It is said to have four fingers on each hand and no thumbs, ape-like facial features, and backward-facing feet with no knees. Its name differs between ethnic groups, for example, the Garifuna call it Sismidu. The name has no true English translation and it is believed to have come from the Nahuatl word, Tzitzimitl.

Honduras 
According to Honduran legends, it is believed that the Sisimite targets and kidnaps human women. It is believed that when a woman falls in love with a Sisimite, the Sisimite will claim her as his own, and she will never be seen again.

The Honduran explorer and historian, Jesús Aguilar Paz (1895-1974), said that the Sisimite lives in the highest part of the Honduran mountains, more specifically in the inaccessible caverns found there. Aguilar also explains that the Sisimite feeds on the wild berries from the mountains and that it is not a carnivorous being or a hunter, however, it usually goes down to the village to kidnap women to take them to their cave. The union of a Sisimite and a human is believed to produce ape men.

Belize 
In Belize a legend, the Sisimite is said to also feast on humans. Furthermore, in Belizean societies, the belief is: "If you are a man and you look at him in the eyes (and escaped), you will die within a month. If you are a woman and you look at him in the eyes (and escaped), your life will be prolonged."Tales of the Sismite were told in the camps by the mahogany cutters of earlier days and are still passed along in villages like Ranchito and Hill Bank. The Sismite is said to live in high forest areas and lives in caves and on rocky land. In the Toledo District, forest areas have decreased over the years because of agricultural development and the Ketchi believe that Tzultacah, the thunder deities who protects them from wild animals, has pulled the Sismite back into the few densely jungled areas remaining, so he is rarely seen today.

The Sisimite diet is believed to consist of raw meat and fruits, and when feasting on human beings, he will tear the body into several pieces before devouring it. Though fierce and malevolent towards humans, he is afraid of water and dogs and will avoid them at all costs. The Sisimite is believe to often assume human form in order to lure people out of villages with the purpose of killing them Because of this, he is sometimes confused with Xtabay or La Llorona.

On Sundays and religious holidays, such as Good Friday, the Sisimite is believed to prey on hunters and other people who stray into the bushes. He follows human footprints, with its main purpose being either to kill its victims or to rip off their thumbs; the Sisimite is also believed to attack men who are killing animals needlessly or destroying the forest.

Outsmarting the Sisimite 
According to beliefs, the Sisimite can be outsmarted due to its lack of intelligence, allowing its victim to escape being pursued.

 If one dances in a circle, the Sisimite will try to follow them. However, due to his backward-facing feet he would trip and fall.
 Having a dog by one's side is said to discourage the Sisimite from coming close.
 The Sisimite is said to be afraid of water, larger bodies like rivers or lakes.
 In other instances, making a path of footprints leading into a bush will cause the Sisimite to lose track of the prey and will begin to follow its own tracks thinking it is someone else's.
 The ultimate way to get rid of the Sisimite is to set fire to his long hair.

In Popular Culture 
The Sisimite is featured in the 1951 B-movie Bride of the Gorilla, directed by Curt Siodmak. The film refers to the creature under one of its many regional names, the súkara. In this film, an Amazonian witch curses a European landowner to turn into the súkara whenever he enters the jungle.

See also 

 Bigfoot
 Bride of the Gorilla
 Xtabay
 Nagual
 La Llorona

References

Belizean folklore
Spanish-language Mesoamerican legendary creatures
Hominid cryptids